Kim Hye-jeong (Hangul: 김혜정; born 3 January 1998) is a South Korean badminton player. She has shown her potential as a badminton player since she was young. Kim entered the regular training in the second grade of elementary school in Wanwol-dong, Masan, and was part of the school team that won the junior national championships in 2008. She won two times German Junior Open in 2014 and 2015 in the girls' doubles event, and clinched two titles at the 2015 Thailand Open in the girls' and mixed doubles event. Kim was part of the national junior team that won the mixed team silver medal at the 2014 and 2015 Asian Junior Championships, and in the individual event, she claim the mixed doubles bronze in 2014, and 2015 silver and bronze medals in the girls' and mixed doubles event respectively. At the 2016 World Junior Championships, she finished in the semifinals, and settled for the bronze medal. Kim joined the MG Saemaeul team in 2016, and selected to join the national team in 2018. She was born in the badminton family. Her mother Chung So-young, was the former 1992 Olympic gold medalist, and her father Kim Bum-shik, is a badminton coach.

Achievements

BWF World Junior Championships 
Mixed doubles

Asian Junior Championships 
Girls' doubles

Mixed doubles

BWF World Tour (2 titles, 3 runners-up) 
The BWF World Tour, which was announced on 19 March 2017 and implemented in 2018, is a series of elite badminton tournaments sanctioned by the Badminton World Federation (BWF). The BWF World Tour is divided into levels of World Tour Finals, Super 1000, Super 750, Super 500, Super 300, and the BWF Tour Super 100.

Women's doubles

References

External links 
 

1998 births
Living people
Sportspeople from South Gyeongsang Province
South Korean female badminton players